Roseberry is an unincorporated community in Nodaway County, in the U.S. state of Missouri.

Roseberry was laid out in 1879, and named after Matthew Roseberry, a promoter of the town site.

References

Unincorporated communities in Nodaway County, Missouri
Unincorporated communities in Missouri